Divya may refer to:
Divya (name), a Hindu first name meaning "divine"
Divya Bhaskar, a Gujarati newspaper
Divya Desams, Srivaishnava shrines that were sung about by Azhvars
Divya Prabha Eye Hospital, eye care hospital in Kerala
Divya Shakti, 1993 Bollywood film
Divya Prabandha, a collection of 4,000 Tamil verses
Divya (rural locality), a rural locality (a settlement) in Perm Krai, Russia

Divya Barge (Dirsha)